Monard's skink (Trachylepis monardi) is a species of skink. It is endemic to Angola. It is named after , the original species descriptor; the current name is a replacement name to solve secondary homonymy with Euprepis angolensis Bocage, 1872 [=Trachylepis varia (Peters, 1867)].

References

monardi
Skinks of Africa
Reptiles of Angola
Endemic fauna of Angola
Reptiles described in 1937
Taxa named by Albert Monard